This list is limited to unmodified production cars which meet the eligibility criteria below. All entries must verified from reliable sources.

Production cars with highest specific power (power-to-weight ratio)

Naturally aspirated

Forced induction

Electric

Hybrid

See also 

 Engine power
 List of fastest production cars by acceleration
 Production car speed record
 List of automotive superlatives
 List of production cars by power output
Power-to-weight ratio

References 

Car performance
Horsepower
Car-related lists